The Actaeon Island, part of the Actaeon Island Group, is a  dolerite island and game reserve located at the southern entrance to the D'Entrecasteaux Channel between Bruny Island and the mainland, that lies close to the south-eastern coast of Tasmania, Australia. The island is named for the ship , which wrecked there in 1822.

There is a navigation beacon on the highest point,  .

Actaeon Island Group
The Actaeon Island Group consists of:

 Actaeon Island
 Blanche Rock
 Courts Island
 Southport Island
 Sterile Island
 The Friars
 The Images

Fauna
Recorded breeding seabird and wader species are the little penguin, short-tailed shearwater and sooty oystercatcher. European rabbits occur on the island and seals occasionally haul-out there. The metallic skink is present. The endangered orange-bellied parrot is historically from the Actaeon Island.

See also

 List of islands of Tasmania

References

Islands of South East Tasmania